Rejean Stringer (pronounced Ray-zhawn, Stron-zhay)  (born August 21, 1974) is a Canadian former professional ice hockey forward who played most of his career in the ECHL.

Early life and education
Stringer was raised in Gravelbourg, Saskatchewan where he began playing hockey at a very young age in a backyard rink. Stringer left home in tenth grade to play for a team in a stronger league. He attended Merrimack College from 1995 to 1999. He led the team in goals scored in the 1996–97 season and led the team in overall scoring the next two years. In the 1997–98 season he also led the nation in assists. That year he scored seven points in Merrimack's upset series victory over top seed Boston University in the Hockey East playoffs. In 1999 he was named to the Hockey East All-Star team.

Professional career
After leaving Merrimack, Stringer played for the Kentucky Thoroughblades of the AHL and the New Orleans Brass of the ECHL in the 1999–2000 season. The next year, he moved to the Fresno Falcons of the now-defunct WCHL. He then played for the Columbia Inferno of the ECHL from 2001 to 2003, making the ECHL all-star team in 2002. He then spent the 2003–04 season in playing for Salzburg in Austria. Stringer returned to ECHL for the 2004–05 season, playing for the Las Vegas Wranglers before being sent to the Peoria Rivermen due to the Wranglers' salary cap issues. The next year he briefly played for the Cardiff Devils of the EIHL before retiring from professional hockey. While in Cardiff, Stringer scored the final goal in the last game that the Devils played at Wales National Ice Rink.

He currently works as an investment advisor for RBC Dominion Securities in his hometown of Gravelbourg.

Career statistics

Awards and honours

References

External links

1974 births
Canadian ice hockey forwards
Ice hockey people from Saskatchewan
Living people
Merrimack Warriors men's ice hockey players
People from Gravelbourg, Saskatchewan
Kentucky Thoroughblades players
New Orleans Brass players
Fresno Falcons players
Columbia Inferno players
Las Vegas Wranglers players
Peoria Rivermen (ECHL) players
Cardiff Devils players
Fransaskois people
Canadian expatriate ice hockey players in Wales
AHCA Division I men's ice hockey All-Americans
Canadian expatriate ice hockey players in the United States
Canadian expatriate ice hockey players in Austria